Chris Pyatt (born 1963 in Islington) is a former world middleweight champion boxer from Leicester, England.

Boxing career

Amateur
He represented England and won a gold medal in the welterweight division, at the 1982 Commonwealth Games in Brisbane, Queensland, Australia.

He was the ABA welterweight champion in 1982, fighting out of Belgrave ABC.

Professional
He won the WBO belt against Sumbu Kalambay on 19 May 1993 but lost it against Steve Collins on 11 May 1994 after 2 successful defences. He currently works with professional fighters.

Professional boxing record

See also
List of world middleweight boxing champions
List of British world boxing champions

References

External links

Team England
Commonwealth Games Federation
Roll of Honour

 

|-

|-

1963 births
Living people
English male boxers
Boxers from Leicester
Commonwealth Games gold medallists for England
Commonwealth Games medallists in boxing
Boxers at the 1982 Commonwealth Games
England Boxing champions
European Boxing Union champions
Commonwealth Boxing Council champions
British Boxing Board of Control champions
Boxers from Greater London
Light-middleweight boxers
World middleweight boxing champions
World Boxing Organization champions
Medallists at the 1982 Commonwealth Games